The Diocese of Ogdensburg is a Latin Church ecclesiastical territory or diocese of the Catholic Church in New York. It was founded on February 16, 1872. It comprises the entirety of Clinton, Essex, Franklin, Jefferson, Lewis and St. Lawrence counties and the northern portions of Hamilton and Herkimer counties.

On February 23, 2010, the Most Reverend Terry Ronald LaValley was appointed diocesan bishop by Pope Benedict XVI and was installed on April 30, 2010. The Diocese of Ogdensburg is a suffragan diocese in the ecclesiastical province of the Archdiocese of New York.

History

Beginnings
The area covered by the Diocese of Ogdensburg was originally inhabited by the Iroquois. The 1600s saw the arrival of French, Dutch, and English fur-traders. Initially Catholics in the North Country were served by priests from Quebec.

In 1749, the Mission of The Holy Trinity was established by Sulpician Abbé François Picquet from Montreal, who built a mission fort named Fort de La Présentation near the junction of the Oswegatchie River and the St Lawrence River. Bishop de Pontbriand of Quebec visited in 1752. During the French and Indian War the fort was garrisoned by French-Canadian military, but abandoned in favor of Fort Lévis.

Diocese of Baltimore
During the Colonial Period and until the end of the American Revolution, the Church in New York State was under the jurisdiction of the Vicariate of London. The first settlers in the region were Protestants from New England. It was only towards 1790 that Acadian Catholic immigrants occupied lands around Corbeau, now Coopersville, near Lake Champlain, where they were occasionally visited by missionaries from Fort Laprairie, Canada. After the Revolution the area came under the Apostolic Prefecture of the United States, which became in 1789 the Diocese of Baltimore.

Diocese of New York
In 1808 the area became part of the new Diocese of New York. In 1818, a colony of French and German Catholics was brought to Jefferson County by Jacques Leray, son of Count Jacques-Donatien Le Ray de Chaumont, who built for them, and also for an Irish settlement, several Catholic churches. At the same time Irish and French Canadian immigrants began to arrive and soon there arose several Catholic missions. By 1833 there were congregations established in Ogdensburg, Carthage, and Plattsburgh, although Carthage did not as yet have a church. Each of them served a number of mission stations, while Minerva, New York was served by Father J. Quinn, who travelled from Troy, New York, 100 miles away.

Diocese of Albany
In 1847 the northern section of the Diocese of New York was split off to become the newly created Diocese of Albany, and an influx of Irish immigrants saw an increase in parishes throughout the area. Missions were established at Antwerp, Belleville, Canton, and many other places. Under Bishop John McCloskey new parishes were founded at Cape Vincent, Hogansburg, Keeseville, and elsewhere. In 1860, Bishop McCloskey put the parish at Carthage under interdict for two years, when disputes between factions resulted in violent confrontations. In 1864 McCloskey established St. Joseph's Seminary as Provincial Seminary at Troy, New York, which trained priests for the Archdiocese until it was relocated to Dunwoodie in 1896.

Diocese of Ogdensburg 

On February 16, 1872, the Diocese of Ogdensburg was established.
First Bishop of Ogdensburg was Edgar Philip Prindle Wadhams.

In 1892, Henry Gabriels, Rector of St Joseph's Seminary in Troy, New York, was appointed second Bishop of Ogdensburg. Catholic Summer School of America first took form in the Champlain Summer School which was founded at New London, Connecticut, 1892, and located more permanently in 1893 at Cliff Haven, New York. Bishop Henry Gabriels was responsible for the growth and development of the Catholic Summer School at Cliff Haven near Plattsburgh, (10,000 people annually), which was a strong influence in Catholic education for many years. (Advance news., October 20, 1968, Page 15, Image 15).

Joseph Henry Conroy served as Bishop from 1921 until his death in 1939. He was made an Honorary Life member of the Catholic Summer School of America, Cliff Haven, N.Y. On March 24, 1924, the Board of Governors elected him Honorary member of the Catholic Writers of America.

Sex abuse 
On February 19, 2020, Diocese of Ogdensburg communications director Darcy Fargo revealed that the Diocese was considering Chapter 11 bankruptcy due to dozens of pending sex abuse lawsuits, stating "Chapter 11 reorganization has been a positive vehicle through which other diocese have been able to address the needs of claims while continuing to undertake their vital mission as church." The Diocese had already nearly $5.5 million in compensation to settle some previous sex abuse lawsuits, and even partook in healing masses and reconciliation therapy as well. By this point in time, 23 more lawsuits had been filed since the 2019 New York Child Victims Act went into effect. At the time of Fargo's announcement, one law firm alone stated it already has 30 more lawsuits in waiting. On May 8, 2020, New York Governor Andrew Cuomo extended the Child Victims Act's statute of limitation deadline to file sex abuse lawsuits from August 14, 2020 to January 14, 2021.

On July 1, 2020, it was revealed that 20 additional sex abuse lawsuits where filed against the Diocese. Fargo responded by stating “I cannot comment on specific allegations or pending litigation. The Diocese of Ogdensburg takes all allegations of abuse seriously, and these new allegations will be investigated.”

Bishops

Bishops of Ogdensburg
 Edgar Philip Prindle Wadhams (1872–1891)
 Henry Gabriels (1892–1921), former Rector of St Joseph's Seminary in Troy, New York
 Joseph Henry Conroy (1921–1939)
 Francis Joseph Monaghan (1939–1942; coadjutor bishop 1936–1939)
 Bryan Joseph McEntegart (1943–1953), appointed Rector of The Catholic University of America and later Bishop of Brooklyn and Archbishop (ad personam)
 Walter P. Kellenberg (1954–1957), appointed in 1957 Bishop of Rockville Centre
 James Johnston Navagh (1957–1963), appointed Bishop of Paterson
 Leo Richard Smith (1963)
 Thomas Andrew Donnellan (1964–1968), appointed Archbishop of Atlanta
 Stanislaus Joseph Brzana (1968–1993)
 Paul Stephen Loverde (1994–1999), appointed Bishop of Arlington
 Gerald Michael Barbarito (2000–2003), appointed Bishop of Palm Beach
 Robert Joseph Cunningham (2004–2009), appointed Bishop of Syracuse
 Terry R. LaValley (2010–present)

Former auxiliary bishops
 Joseph Henry Conroy (1912-1921), appointed bishop of this diocese

Other priest of this diocese who became bishop
Douglas John Lucia, appointed Bishop of Syracuse in 2019

Deaneries

There are eight deaneries in the diocese:
 Adirondack (Northern Essex County and southern Franklin County)
 Clinton (Northeastern Essex and all of its namesake county)
 Essex (The remainder of its namesake county)
 Franklin (The remainder of its namesake county)
 Hamilton/Herkimer (The remainder of namesake counties not occupied by the Diocese of Albany)
 Jefferson
 Lewis
 St. Lawrence

Parishes

High schools
 Immaculate Heart Central High School, Watertown
 Seton Catholic Central High School, Plattsburgh

References

External links 
Roman Catholic Diocese of Ogdensburg Official Site

 
Ogdensburg
Ogdensburg
1872 establishments in New York (state)
Ogdensburg